(literally: "Economy Bank Turkey Inc.") was a former Turkish bank. Renamed in 1980, it was closed down in 2001 due to financial problems.

History
Following the İzmir Economic Congress in 1923, a number of small local banks were founded in Turkey. In 1971, it was reconstituted as a deposit bank operating nationwide.

As one of the two banks affected by the financial crises took place in Turkey during February 2001, İktisat Banksaı went under the control of the Banking Regulation and Supervision Agency  (BDDK) because of deposit outflows. At that ime, the bank ranked at 20th place in Turkey in terms of assets. It had 62 branches and 1,339 employees. The bank was transferred on March 15, 2001, to the Savings Deposit Insurance Fund of Turkey (TMSF). The TMSF twice offered the bank for sale, however, it received no demand. The bank's cumulative loss amounted to  1.757 billion (around US$1.105 billion).

References

Banks established in 1927
Companies based in Denizli
Companies based in Istanbul
Banks disestablished in 2001
Defunct banks of Turkey